Peter Myles (born 1968 in Amherst, Nova Scotia) is a film music editor.

Peter Myles was born in Nova Scotia, Canada and has been a film music editor since 1998. He is a graduate of the New England Conservatory (B.M. Trumpet Performance) and Northwestern University (M.M. Pi Kappa Lambda - Trumpet Performance) with additional studies at the Music Academy of the West and the Aspen Music Festival. As a trumpeter he substituted with the Chicago Symphony Orchestra, was a member of the Sarasota Opera Orchestra, and performed with the Boston Concert Opera Orchestra and numerous groups in the Boston and Chicago areas. Upon moving to Los Angeles, he joined the staff of Delos Records as a producer/editor where he produced recordings of The Westminter Choir, flutist Jean - Pierre Rampal, tenor John Aler, and guitarist Paul Galbraith, among others. In addition to his film work, he has continued to work in the record industry with credits including John William's "Cello Concerto", "An American Journey" and more than a dozen film soundtracks.

Filmography

 Stepmom (1998)
 Star Wars: Episode I – The Phantom Menace (1999)
 Angela's Ashes (1999)
 The Patriot (2000)
 Proof of Life (2000)
 The Family Man (2000)
 The Huntress (2000) (TV)
 A.I. Artificial Intelligence (2001)
 Planet of the Apes (2001)
 The Princess Diaries (2001)
 Harry Potter and the Philosopher's Stone (2001)
 Star Wars: Episode II – Attack of the Clones (2002)
 Minority Report (2002)
 Harry Potter and the Chamber of Secrets (2002)
 Seabiscuit (2003)
 Highwaymen (2003)
 Harry Potter and the Prisoner of Azkaban (2004)

 The Terminal - 2004
 The Bourne Supremacy (2004)
 War of the Worlds (2005)
 Æon Flux (2005) (TV)
 King Kong (2005)
 X-Men: The Last Stand (2006)
 September Dawn (2007)
 Transformers (2007)
 The Bourne Ultimatum (2007)
 The Great Buck Howard (2008)
 The Incredible Hulk (2008)
 The Tale of Despereaux (2008)
 Green Zone (2010)
 The Rite (2011)
 Red Dawn (2012)
 Safe House (2012)
 Pacific Rim (2013)
 Blackhat (2015)
 Warcraft (2016)
 Now You See Me 2 (2016)
 Jason Bourne (2016)
 The Mountain Between Us (2017)
 The Greatest Showman (2017)
 Alita Battle Angel (2019)
 Fast & Furious Presents: Hobbs & Shaw (2019)
 Star Wars: Episode IX - The Rise of Skywalker (2019)

References

External links
 
 Peter Myles work with composers according to the IMDB

1969 births
Living people
Canadian audio engineers
Canadian expatriate musicians in the United States
Musicians from Nova Scotia
People from Amherst, Nova Scotia